Rita O'Hare ( McCulloch;  1943 – 3 March 2023) was the General Secretary of Sinn Féin, and from 1998 to 2023 the party's representative to the United States.

Rita McCulloch was born and raised in Belfast, Northern Ireland, the daughter of a Catholic nationalist mother and a Protestant Socialist father. She had one surviving sibling, a brother, Alan McCulloch.

O'Hare was involved in the civil rights campaign and later became a republican. She was editor of the Irish republican newspaper An Phoblacht ("Republican News") (AP/RN) in the 1980s and early 1990s. She was also director of publicity for Sinn Féin, succeeding Danny Morrison in that position.

O'Hare was arrested in Northern Ireland in 1972 for the attempted murder of British Army Warrant Officer Frazer Paton in Belfast in October 1971. She also faced malicious wounding and possession of firearms charges. Upon her release on bail she fled to Dublin in the Republic of Ireland where she lived with her family. She was unable to return to the UK due to an outstanding arrest warrant. Sinn Féin had presented her case to the British Government as one of the IRA 'on the runs' (OTRs) under consideration to be allowed to return to Northern Ireland.

O'Hare served a three-year sentence in Limerick Prison for smuggling explosives to an IRA member and was released in 1979.

Upon her release, her extradition from the Republic of Ireland was blocked as the Irish High Court ruled in March 1978 that O'Hare should not be extradited to Northern Ireland, on the grounds that the offences that she was alleged to have committed fell within the political offence exception.

Based in Dublin, she was temporarily banned from entering the United States after she traveled to Florida for a meeting (the terms of her special visa require that she first notify authorities before such travel). She was ineligible for a regular visa due to the outstanding warrant.

O’Hare died on 3 March 2023, aged 80. She died at her home in Dublin following a long illness.

References

1940s births
Year of birth missing
2023 deaths
20th-century politicians from Northern Ireland
21st-century politicians from Northern Ireland
Fugitives wanted by the United Kingdom
Irish republicans
Politicians from Belfast
Provisional Irish Republican Army members
Republicans imprisoned during the Northern Ireland conflict
Sinn Féin politicians
Women in the politics of Northern Ireland
Women in war in Ireland
Women in warfare post-1945